The 1948 World Table Tennis Championships women's doubles was the 14th edition of the women's doubles championship.
Vera Thomas-Dace and Peggy Franks defeated Dora Beregi and Helen Elliot in the final by three sets to one.

Results

See also
List of World Table Tennis Championships medalists

References

-
1948 in women's table tennis